The Nine Billion Names of God (1967) is a collection of science fiction short stories by Arthur C. Clarke.

According to Clarke's 1972 book The Lost Worlds of 2001, the book comprises his own selection of favorites.

Contents
This collection includes:

 "The Nine Billion Names of God"
 "I Remember Babylon"
 "Trouble with Time"
 "Rescue Party"
 "The Curse"
 "Summertime on Icarus"
 "Dog Star"
 "Hide and Seek"
 "Out of the Sun"
 "The Wall of Darkness"
 "No Morning After"
 "The Possessed"
 "Death and the Senator"
 "Who's There?"
 "Before Eden"
 "Superiority"
 "A Walk in the Dark"
 "The Call of the Stars"
 "The Reluctant Orchid"
 "Encounter at Dawn"
 "If I Forget Thee, Oh Earth..."
 "Patent Pending"
 "The Sentinel"
 "Transience"
 "The Star"

Sources

External links 
 

1967 short story collections
Short story collections by Arthur C. Clarke

hu:Isten kilencmilliárd neve